Darwin Daniel Matheus Tovar (born 9 April 2001) is a Venezuelan professional footballer who plays as a forward for Croatian Football League side NK Istra 1961.

Club career
Born in Barinas, Matheus began his career with Primera División side Zamora. He made his professional debut for the club on 2 September 2018 against Zulia in the league. He came on as a 66th minute substitute for Enderson Abreu as Zamora won 2–1. On 24 September, Matheus scored his first professional goal against Deportivo Anzoátegui. His 54th minute goal was the only one for Zamora in a 1–2 defeat. Despite just appearing in nine matches during the 2018 season, Matheus still earned his first title when Zamora won the Primera División that season.

On April 1, 2021, Matheus was announced as a member of Atlanta United 2.

On December 14, 2022 Matheus signed a contract with Croatian side Istra 1961.

Career statistics

Club

Honours
Zamora team
Venezuelan Primera División: 2018

References

2001 births
Living people
Venezuelan footballers
Association football forwards
Atlanta United 2 players
USL Championship players
Venezuelan Primera División players
Zamora FC players
People from Barinas (state)